Sergio Andres Roitman (born 16 May 1979), nicknamed 'Motoneta' (Shotgun in Spanish) is a retired professional tennis player from Argentina.

He achieved a career-high rankings of world No. 62 in singles in October 2007, and world No. 45 in doubles in September 2008.

He won several Challenger and Futures singles titles in his career. In addition, Roitman won two ATP doubles titles - at Amsterdam in 2000, and Umag in 2001.

Early and personal life

Roitman was born in Buenos Aires, Argentina, and is Jewish. Roitman, along with Dudi Sela, Diego Schwartzman, and Camila Giorgi was one of a number of recent Jewish tennis players ranked in the top 100.

His father (Hugo) is an executive salesman for a plastic enterprise company, and his mother (Lidia) is a retired financial adviser.  He has an older brother who teaches tennis, named Ivan.

Roitman studied classical piano between the ages of 6 and 12, but chose tennis instead. At the age of 17, he was at a Hermética concert and was shot in the stomach with a rubber bullet. He speaks Spanish, Portuguese, English and Italian.

Tennis career

Roitman began playing tennis at age 10 and turned professional in 1996.

Between 1998 and 2000 Roitman won seven futures singles titles, all of them in South America on clay. On 2000-07-23 he won the ATP doubles title with fellow countryman Andres Schneiter in Amsterdam in his debut at that level.

In 2001, once again with Schneiter, he won his second ATP doubles title in Umag. Roitman won four Challenger singles titles between 2002 and 2005, in the process defeating Rafael Nadal 6-3, 6-7, 6-4 in the $50,000 ATP Challenger final in Cherbourg in 2003. At the 2003 Roland Garros Roitman played defending champion Albert Costa in the first round and was leading 2 sets to 0 and 4–1 (with a break point for 5–1), but ended up losing in 5 sets.

2006 saw Roitman finish in the Top 100 of ATP rankings for the first time in his career, he compiled a 41–19 match record, and won two titles in Challenger action.  In November he won the title at Challengers in Aracaju and Guayaquil.

2007 was the most successful season for Roitman, where he reached his highest ranking and finished in the top 75 for the second straight year, highlighted by a career-best 11 ATP match wins and three Challenger titles.  In June he captured the Prostějov Challenger title.  In September he picked up another Challenger title in Szczecin, Poland.  He closed the season with the title at the Buenos Aires Challenger. He had wins over world # 41 José Acasuso of Argentina, 7–6 (4), 6–1, in Buenos Aires, Argentina.  In April he defeated world # 76 Jan Hernych, 7–5, 7–6 (7), in Valencia, Spain, and world # 29 Jürgen Melzer of Austria on clay, 3–6, 6–1, 6–4 in Monte Carlo.  In June he beat world # 28 Philipp Kohlschreiber of Germany, 6–2, Ret, in 's-Hertogenbosch, The Netherlands on grass.  In July he defeated world # 65 Nicolás Massú of Chile 7–5, 6–2, and twice defeated world # 18 (and 20) Juan Ignacio Chela of Argentina 5–7, 6–3, 6–4, and 6–1, 6–2, on clay.

In the 2009 Buenos Aires tournament Roitman lost 6–0, 6–0 to Juan Mónaco.  In June 2009 at Wimbledon, he retired from his first round match due to a recurring injury to the acromion in his right shoulder.

On September 25, 2009, he announced that the Copa Petrobas Challenger in Buenos Aires would be his last professional tournament, citing injuries as the main reason for his retirement.

Career after retiring from tennis
After retiring from tennis, in 2015 Roitman and two partners started a company (GO Events) that supplies turnkey customized accommodations, cleaning staff, drivers, mobiles, and services for media work teams attending large-scale sporting events.

ATP career finals

Doubles: 2 (2 titles)

ATP Challenger and ITF Futures finals

Singles: 32 (17–15)

Doubles: 48 (29–19)

Performance timelines

Singles

Doubles

See also
List of select Jewish tennis players

References

External links 
 
 
 Roitman world ranking history
 Interview w/Sergio Roitman, 6/22/09

1979 births
Living people
Argentine Jews
Argentine male tennis players
Jewish tennis players
Jewish Argentine sportspeople
Tennis players from Buenos Aires